German submarine U-851 was a long-range Type IXD2 U-boat built for Nazi Germany's Kriegsmarine during World War II.

She was ordered on 20 January 1941, and was laid down on 18 March 1942 at DeSchiMAG AG Weser, Bremen, as yard number 1057. She was launched on 15 January 1943 and commissioned under the command of Korvettenkapitän Hannes Weingärtner on 21 May 1943.

Design 
German Type IXD2 submarines were considerably larger than the original Type IXs. U-851 had a displacement of  when at the surface and  while submerged. She had two shafts and two  propellers.

U-851 was fitted with six  torpedo tubes (four fitted at the bow and two at the stern), 24 torpedoes, one  SK C/32 naval gun, 150 rounds, and a  SK C/30 with 2575 rounds as well as two  C/30 anti-aircraft guns with 8100 rounds. The boat had a complement of fifty-five.

Service history 
U-851 was last heard from on 27 March 1944, thirty-one days into her first, and only, war patrol. She is presumed sunk in the North Atlantic with all 70 of her crew missing.

Her last known position was southeast of St. John's, Newfoundland .

References

Bibliography

External links 

World War II submarines of Germany
German Type IX submarines
Ships built in Bremen (state)
1943 ships
U-boats commissioned in 1943
U-boats sunk in 1944
Ships lost with all hands
World War II shipwrecks in the Atlantic Ocean
Maritime incidents in March 1944
Missing U-boats of World War II